

Ownership group 
 Monfort family
 Alvarado Construction
 Breakthru Beverage Group
 The Denver Post (The Denver Post, LLC)
 SAMT Sports 2013 LLC

Executive officers
 Dick Monfort, chairman and chief executive officer
 Charlie Monfort, general partner
 Gregory D. Feasel, executive vice president/chief operating officer
 Harold R. Roth, executive vice president/chief financial officer and general counsel
 Jill Campbell, vice president – communications and marketing
 Rolando Fernandez, vice president – international scouting and development
 Kevin H. Kahn, vice president/chief customer officer – ballpark operations
 James P. Kellogg, vice president – community and retail operations
 Michael J. Kent, vice president – finance
 Sue Ann McClaren, vice president – ticket sales, operations and services
 Walker Monfort, vice president – corporate partnerships
 William E. Schmidt, vice president – scouting
 Elizabeth E. Stecklein, vice president – human resources

Former executives
 Jerry McMorris (principal owner 1992–2005, president 1993–2001)
 Keli McGregor (president, 2001–2010)
 Bob Gebhard (general manager, 1992–1999)
 Dan O'Dowd (general manager, 1999–2014)
 Bill Geivett (director of major league operations, 2012–2014)
 Josh Byrnes (assistant general manager, 1999–2001)
 Jerry Dipoto (head of scouting, 2005)
 Jeff Bridich, senior vice president and general manager (2014-2021)

References

External links
 Baseball America: Executive Database

 
 
Colorado
Owners and executives